Ways of Being is a 2022 book on artificial intelligence and the natural world by James Bridle.

A reviewer for The American Spectator said that the theme of the book was collaborative intelligence among humans, computers, and all of nature.

A reviewer for Geographical said that the book described situations where humans developed remarkable new technology by observing natural processes.

A reviewer for Kirkus Reviews described the book as scientifically precise but accessible to general audiences.

Musician Brian Eno discussed the book with the author to discuss creativity in nature.

References

External links
Author's website

2022 non-fiction books
Science and technology studies works
Sociology of scientific knowledge
Farrar, Straus and Giroux books